Derek Cruz (born 23 May 1955) acted as a Jockey & assistant trainer before being granted a full permit to train in Hong Kong starting in 1991. He got a successful 2010/11 season in which he sent out 24 winners for an overall total of 432.

Significant horses
 Natural Blitz
 Good Ba Ba
 Joy And Fun
 Cerise Cherry

Performance

References
The Hong Kong Jockey Club – Trainer Information
The Hong Kong Jockey Club http://www.hkjc.com/home/english/index.asp

1955 births
Living people
Hong Kong horse trainers